VAC or Vac may refer to:

Arts and entertainment
 Variety Artists Club of New Zealand
 Velvet Acid Christ, an industrial band
 Video Appeals Committee, appeals board against BBFC video classifications in the UK
 Visual Arts Centre, now part of La Trobe Institute, Bendigo, Australia
 Zambia National Visual Arts Council

Business
 Valve Amplification Company, audio component manufacturer 
 Vologda Air Company, a Russian airline

Government
 Veterans Affairs Canada
 Veterans Affairs Council, Taiwan

Health
 Vaccinate Alaska Coalition
 Vacuum assisted closure wound therapy

Sport
 Vác-Újbuda LTC, a football club based in Vác, Hungary
 Vívó és Atlétikai Club, a defunct Hungarian sports club

Technology
 Valve Anti-Cheat software for games
Vergence-accommodation conflict, a visual phenomenon associated with the use of stereoscopic devices
 Virtual Audio Cable, software to transfer audio

Other uses
 Vác, a city in Hungary
 Roman Catholic Diocese of Vác
 -vac, toponymic suffix in Serbia and Croatia for "town"
 V Amphibious Corps, of World War II US Marine Corps
 Vāc, Sanskrit for "speech", also a Vedic goddess
 Pacific Central Station, Vancouver, British Columbia, Canada, station code

See also
 VAK (disambiguation)